¿Qué pides tú? (What do you ask for?) is the debut studio album title from Alex Ubago. It was released on September 23, 2001 in Spain in the middle of the Operación Triunfo boom (despite Ubago's isolation from the reality programme itself). It was certified 9× Platinum in Spain, 2× Platinum in México, Platinum in Argentina and in 2007 Platinum in Europe. It's the best selling album on his career, with more than 1.5 million copies sold worldwide.

Track listing
 ¿Qué Pides Tú? (What Do You Ask For?)
 A Gritos De Esperanza (Screams of Hope)
 ¿Sabes? (You Know?)
 No Te Rindas (Don't give up)
 Hay Que Ver (One must see)
 Sin Miedo A Nada (Without fear of anything)
 Ahora Que No Estás (Now that you are not here)
 Por Esta Ciudad (In this city)
 Vuelves A Pensar (Think Again)
 Dime Si No Es Amor (Tell me if it isn't love)

Sales and certifications

See also
List of best-selling albums in Spain

References

2003 debut albums
Álex Ubago albums
Spanish-language albums
Warner Music Group albums